Rentapia is a genus of true toads, family Bufonidae. It is endemic to Southeast Asia and occurs in the Malay Peninsula (including extreme southern peninsular Thailand), Borneo, and Sumatra. It was erected in 2016 resolve the polyphyly of Pedostibes.

Etymology
The generic epithet honors the legendary Iban warrior Libau Rentap, "a great war chief, freedom fighter, and Malaysian national hero."

Description
Interorbital cranial crests are absent. The parotoid glands are large and distinct, and may be oval, circular, or triangular in dorsal view. The fingers have basal webbing and tips that are expanded into flat discs. The feet are fully webbed on all toes except the fourth one. Males have nuptial pads.

Ecology
Adult Rentapia  are primarily arboreal and live in riparian vegetation around small- to moderately-sized forest streams. The eggs are small and pigmented and laid as strings.

Species
There are three recognized species:
 Rentapia everetti (Boulenger, 1896)
 Rentapia flavomaculata Chan, Abraham, and Badli-Sham, 2020
 Rentapia hosii (Boulenger, 1892)

The formerly recognised Rentapia rugosa is a synonym of R. everetti.

References

Bufonidae
 
Amphibians of Asia
Amphibian genera
Taxa named by Robin Kurian Abraham
Taxa named by Rafe M. Brown
Taxa named by Larry Lee Grismer
Taxa named by Chan Kin Onn